The 1952 Macdonald Brier, the Canadian men's national curling championship, was held from March 3 to 8, 1952 at Winnipeg Amphitheatre in Winnipeg, Manitoba. Winnipeg became the first Canadian city outside of Toronto to host a Brier more than once. A total of 12,500 fans attended the event.

Team Manitoba, who was skipped by Billy Walsh became the second team to capture the Brier Tankard in their hometown as they finished round robin play unbeaten with a 10–0 record. This was the thirteenth time that Manitoba had won the Brier and the eighth time in which a team finished a Brier undefeated. This would also be the first of two Briers won by Walsh, with his other championship coming in 1956.

This was the fifth and most recent Brier in which there were no games that went to an extra end.

Teams
The teams are listed as follows:

Round-robin standings

Round-robin results

Draw 1

Draw 2

Draw 3

Draw 4

Draw 5

Draw 6

Draw 7

Draw 8

Draw 9

Draw 10

Draw 11

References

External links 
 Video: 

Macdonald Brier, 1952
Macdonald Brier, 1952
The Brier
Curling competitions in Winnipeg
Macdonald Brier
Macdonald Brier
20th century in Winnipeg